Gueltas is a commune in the Morbihan department in Brittany in north-western France.

Gueltas is twinned with Altarnun, Cornwall. Inhabitants of Gueltas are called in French Gueltasiens.

See also
Communes of the Morbihan department

References

External links

 Mayors of Morbihan Association 

Communes of Morbihan